Macaronesia is a collection of four volcanic archipelagos in the North Atlantic, off the coasts of Africa and Europe. Each archipelago is made up of a number of Atlantic oceanic islands, which are formed by seamounts on the ocean floor whose peaks have risen above the ocean's surface. Some of the Macaronesian islands belong to Portugal, some belong to Spain, and the rest belong to Cape Verde. Politically, the islands belonging to Portugal and Spain are part of the European Union. Geologically, Macaronesia is part of the African tectonic plate. Some of its islands – the Azores – are situated along the edge of that plate at the point where it abuts the Eurasian and North American plates.

In one biogeographical system, the Cape Verde archipelago is in the Afrotropical realm while the other three archipelagos are in the Palearctic realm. According to the European Environment Agency, the three European archipelagos constitute a unique bioregion, known as the Macaronesian Biogeographic Region. The World Geographical Scheme for Recording Plant Distributions places the whole of Macaronesia in its botanical continent of Africa.

Macaronesia has a combined population of 3,222,054 people; 2,172,944 (67%) in the Canary Islands, 561,901 (17%) in Cape Verde, 250,769 (8%) in Madeira and 236,440 (7%) in the Azores.

Etymology
The name Macaronesia is derived from the Greek words meaning 'islands of the fortunate'. The name was first used by ancient Greek geographers to refer to any islands west of the Strait of Gibraltar. Macaronesia is occasionally misspelled Macronesia in false analogy with Micronesia, an unrelated group of archipelagos in the Pacific Ocean whose English name is also derived from Greek.

Archipelagos 

Macaronesia consists of four main archipelagos. From north to south, these are:
 the Azores, an Autonomous Region of Portugal
 Madeira (including the Savage Islands), an Autonomous Region of Portugal
 the Canary Islands, an Autonomous Community of Spain
 Cape Verde, an independent West African country

Geography and geology

The islands of Macaronesia are volcanic in origin, and are thought to be the product of several geologic hotspots. Due to the geographic location, varied relief and altitudinal ranges, the Macaronesian mountains represent a wide range of climates. There are maritime temperate, Mediterranean, and subtropical climates in the Azores and Madeira; Mediterranean and subtropical climates in some of the Canary Islands; arid and semiarid climates in certain geologically older islands of the Canaries (notably Lanzarote and Fuerteventura) and in some of the islands of the Madeira Archipelago (Selvagens and Porto Santo) and Cape Verde (Sal, Boa Vista and Maio); and a tropical climate in the younger islands of both of the southernmost archipelagos (Santo Antão, Santiago, and Fogo in Cape Verde). In some locations, there are variations in climate due to the rain shadow effect. The laurisilva forests of Macaronesia are a type of mountain cloud forest with relict plant species of a vegetation type that originally covered much of the Mediterranean Basin, when the climate of that region was more humid. These plant species, many of which are endemic, have evolved to adapt to the islands’ variable climatic conditions.

The Macaronesian islands have a biogeography that is unique in the world. They are home to several distinct plant and animal communities. Notably, the jumping spider genus Macaroeris is even named after Macaronesia. Because none of the Macaronesian islands were ever part of any continent, all of the native plants and animals reached the islands via long-distance dispersal. Laurel-leaved forests, called laurisilva, once covered most of the Azores, Madeira, and parts of the Canaries at an altitude of between 400 and 1200 m (the eastern Canaries and Cape Verde being too dry). These forests resemble the ancient forests that covered the Mediterranean basin and northwestern Africa before the cooling and drying of the ice ages. Trees of the genera Apollonias, Clethra, Dracaena, Ocotea, Persea, and Picconia, which are found in the Macaronesian laurel forests, are also known (from fossil evidence) to have flourished around the Mediterranean before the ice ages.

Conservation issues

Much of the original native vegetation has been displaced because of human activity, including felling forests for timber and firewood, clearing vegetation for grazing and agriculture, and introducing foreign plants and animals into the islands. The laurisilva habitat has been reduced to small disconnected pockets. As a result, many of the endemic biota of the islands are now seriously endangered or extinct. Alien predators – in particular domestic and feral cats – currently pose one of the most serious threats to the endemic fauna. Even though cats prey mostly on other foreign-introduced mammals, such as rodents and rabbits, the abundance of such prey sustains such a large feline population that it has initiated a so-called hyperpredation process, which further increases that population's negative impact on the number of endemic reptiles and birds.

Since 2001, the European Union's conservation efforts, mandated by its Natura 2000 regulations, have resulted in the protection of large stretches of land and sea in the Azores, Madeira, and the Canary Islands, totaling 5000 km².

See also 

 Fortunate Isles
 Geology of the Canary Islands
 Geology of Cape Verde
 Geology of Madeira
 Laurel forest
 List of islands in the Atlantic Ocean
 Regions of Europe
 West Africa

References

External links
 
 European Union: Report on biodiversity in Macaronesia
 Review on cats' diet on Macaronesian islands

 
Floristic provinces
Floristic regions
Geographical neologisms
Landforms of the Atlantic Ocean
Phytogeography